The Asian Journal of Communication is a peer-reviewed academic journal which focuses on the systems and processes of communication in the Asia-Pacific region and among Asian communities around the world. The journal is published by Routledge on behalf of the Asian Media Information and Communication Centre and the editor-in-chief is Ang Peng Hwa.

Abstracting and indexing 
The journal is abstracted and indexed in

According to the Journal Citation Reports, the journal has a 2018 impact factor of 1.097.

References

External links 
 

Routledge academic journals
English-language journals
Publications established in 1990
Bimonthly journals
Communication journals